The 2005–06 Toto Cup Leumit was the 17th time the cup was being contested. The final was played at Ramat Gan Stadium on 31 January 2006.

The winners were Hapoel Acre, beating Hapoel Be'er Sheva on penalties in the final after 0–0 in 120 minutes.

Group stage

Group A

Group B

Semi-finals

Final

See also
 Toto Cup
 2005–06 Liga Leumit
 2005–06 in Israeli football

References
Toto Cup Leumit 2005/06 walla.co.il 
05–06 Season one.co.il

External links
 Official website 

Leumit
Toto Cup Leumit
Israel Toto Cup Leumit